Hopscotch is a children's game.

Hopscotch may also refer to:

Fiction
 Hopscotch (Cortázar novel), a 1963 novel by Julio Cortázar
 Hopscotch (Garfield novel), a 1975 novel by Brian Garfield
 Hopscotch (film), a 1980 adaptation of Garfield's novel
 Hopscotch, a 2002 novel by Kevin J. Anderson

Music
 Hopscotch (opera), a 2015 experimental opera
 Hopscotch Music Festival, an annual event in Raleigh, North Carolina, US
 Hopscotch Records, a record label co-founded by Assif Tsahar
 Hopscotch, an album, or the title song, by Mothfight, 2007
 "Hopscotch" (Emmelie de Forest song), 2015
 "Hopscotch", a song by 88rising from Head in the Clouds II, 2019
 "Hopscotch", a song by Tinashe from Songs for You, 2019

Other uses
 Hopscotch (card game) or Calculation, a solitaire card game
 Hopscotch (programming language), a visual programming language
 Hopscotch, an Australian film distribution company acquired by Entertainment One

See also
 Hopscotch hashing, in computer programming
 Hopscotch pattern or Pythagorean tiling, a floor tile layout